The Hero of Submarine D-2 is a lost 1916 silent film adventure war film directed by Paul Scardon and starring Charles Richman. It was produced by the Vitagraph Company of America and released by V-L-S-E Incorporated.

Cast 
Charles Richman – Lt. Commander Colton
James W. Morrison – Gilman Austen
Anders Randolf – J.F. Austin (*as Anders Randolph)
Charles Wellesley – Captain McMasters
Thomas R. Mills – James Archer (*as Thomas Mills)
L. Rogers Lytton – The Ruanian ambassador
Eleanor Woodruff – Caroline Autsten
Zena Keefe – Ethel McMasters

uncredited
Commander R. K. Crank
Captain Louis M. Milton
Lieutenant Roger K. Welles
Lieutenant Commander Franck Taylor Evans

References

External links 

1916 films
American black-and-white films
American silent feature films
Films directed by Paul Scardon
Lost American films
Vitagraph Studios films
American war films
1910s war films
1916 lost films
Lost war films
1910s American films